Franklin Pierce Tate House is a historic home located at Morganton, Burke County, North Carolina.  It was designed by architect Electus D. Litchfield and completed in 1928. It is a two-story, Colonial Revival style dwelling constructed of irregularly-coursed, rock-faced granite blocks.

It consists of a main block measuring 52 feet by 33 feet, with a recessed two-story wing. The front entrance features a semi-circular, flat-roofed portico. It was built by Franklin Pierce Tate (1867–1937), a prominent Morganton banker and mill-owner, and son of Colonel Samuel McDowell Tate who built the Tate House.

It was listed on the National Register of Historic Places in 1986. It is located in the West Union Street Historic District.

References

Houses on the National Register of Historic Places in North Carolina
Colonial Revival architecture in North Carolina
Houses completed in 1928
Houses in Burke County, North Carolina
National Register of Historic Places in Burke County, North Carolina
Individually listed contributing properties to historic districts on the National Register in North Carolina